Storm Rising is a 1995 fantasy novel by American writer Mercedes Lackey, the second in her Mage Storms trilogy.

Plot summary 
Duke Tremane, who has been sent by the Empire to conquer Hardorn, is having second thoughts about his homeland. Since he has been basically stranded by the Emperor, he takes matters into his own hands. As he has a copy of the Imperial Seal locked up in a special desk inherited from his aunt, he writes documents authorizing him to take all the contents of an Imperial storehouse. Then the mages in his army create a gate to the storehouse and Duke Tremane and a number of his men then proceed to take as much of the contents as they can.

Meanwhile, in Valdemar, Karal has been assigned to take over as Karsite ambassador following the death of his mentor and previous ambassador, Ulrich. He has to deal with the Shin'a'in ambassador taking over from the previous one, who has also died. However, Andesha is able to help and the Shin'a'in ambassador eventually apologizes to Karal for his previous behavior.

Duke Tremane has elected to sever ties with the Empire and devotes his time to helping the people of Hardorn. All spies in his army defect over to him and the local people start to like having Duke Tremane around, especially when he and some of his men help find a group of kids who ended up being lost in a snowstorm.

Karal, Andesha, and Natoli use magic to spy on Duke Tremane and discover that he isn't what he seems. The firecat Altra agrees that it would be a good idea for Duke Tremane to join the Alliance and Jumps Karal with him to Hardorn. There, Karal hands Duke Tremane a message tube and asks him to consider joining the Alliance. Altra returns a week later to collect the tube.

Meanwhile, the Son of the Sun Solaris visits Valdemar with her Firecat Hansa to further relations with Valdemar and Queen Selenay. Needless to say, Solaris and Selenay are shocked when they read the message that Duke Tremane wishes to join the Alliance. Solaris confines Karal to his room and has Hansa Jump her to Hardorn. After confronting Duke Tremane, she decides that he doesn't mean any harm and leaves, but not before doing a spell that will keep him from ever lying again in the future. Karal is not punished and is allowed to continue as the Karsite Ambassador.

Sejanes, a very old mage, and teacher to Duke Tremane, is sent to Valdemar to help deal with the magic storms currently going on. Karal, Andesha, Firesong, and Silverfox leave Valdemar for Uthro's tower in order to deal with the storms. The Companion Florian goes with them, and several other Companions go along as well to carry the other people.

1995 American novels
American fantasy novels
Valdemar Universe